Newark Town Football Club is a football club from Newark on Trent.

History
The original Newark team was formed in 1868 and played for much of the time in the Midland Counties League. The club disbanded at the start of the Second World War but the club had tasted FA Cup success during the early 1930s. They reached the second round of the FA Cup in the 1930–31 season and made the first round proper in three out of four seasons between 1929–30 and 1933–34.

For a brief period in the 1970s a group of players played under the Newark Town banner but it was not until the late 1980s that the club properly reformed. Initially the club only fielded junior teams but the decision was taken in 1994 to start an adults side and joined the Nottinghamshire Alliance in 1997. Newark progressed in that league, winning the Division One championship in 2003–04, earning the club promotion to the Central Midlands League. 2011 saw a re-organisation of the League and the club was placed in the South Division. They have since been transferred to the North Division.

Newark Town won the Central Midlands League North Division title during the 2021-22 season and gained promotion to the United Counties League Division One which is step 6 in the National League System.

Community Ownership
"Newark Town Football Club Limited was registered under the Industrial and Provident Societies Act 1965. It is known as an Industrial and Provident Society (IPS) or a Community Benefit Society and is regulated by the Financial Services Authority."

League history
 1892–96 Midland League
 1899–1909 Midland League
 1925–33 Midland League
 1936–40 Midland League
 1997–2003 Notts Alliance Division Two
 2003–04 Notts Alliance Division One
 2004–08 Central Midlands League Premier Division
 2008–11 Central Midlands League Supreme Division
 2011–13 Central Midlands League South Division
 2013–22 Central Midlands League North Division
 2022-present United Counties League Division One

Records
FA Cup
 Second round 1930–31
FA Vase
 First round 2005–06, 2008–09

Junior Section

Newark Town FC includes juniors teams ranging from Under 7s to Under 18s

From the age groups U7s to U14s teams in the Young Elizabethan Football League on Saturdays.  The age groups from U15s to U18s compete in the Notts Youth League

Ladies Section

Newark Town Ladies teams competes in the Notts Girls and Ladies League - Division Two

Sunday Team

Newark Town Sunday team competes in the Newark Alliance

References

Season-by-season record since 2011

External links

Football clubs in England
Football clubs in Nottinghamshire
Association football clubs established in 1868
1868 establishments in England
Fan-owned football clubs in England
Central Midlands Football League
Newark-on-Trent
Central Combination
East Midlands Regional League
United Counties League